Marc Megna (born July 30, 1976) is a former professional American and Canadian football linebacker and defensive end in the National Football League (NFL),  NFL Europe League and Canadian Football League (CFL). In his seven-year pro career he played for the New England Patriots and Cincinnati Bengals of the NFL, the Barcelona Dragons and Berlin Thunder of NFL Europe, and the Montreal Alouettes of the CFL. Megna played college football at Richmond.

Professional career
Megna was selected by the New York Jets in the sixth round (183rd overall) of the 1999 NFL Draft.

References

External links
 Official site

1976 births
Living people
Sportspeople from Fall River, Massachusetts
Players of American football from Massachusetts
American football linebackers
Richmond Spiders football players
New England Patriots players
Barcelona Dragons players
Cincinnati Bengals players
Berlin Thunder players
Montreal Alouettes players
American players of Canadian football
Canadian football defensive linemen
B.M.C. Durfee High School alumni